Brandi Marie Carlile (born June 1, 1981) is an American singer-songwriter and producer whose music spans many genres, including folk rock, alternative country, Americana, and classic rock. , Carlile has released seven studio albums. She has received nine Grammy Awards and earned 25 Grammy nominations, including one for The Firewatcher's Daughter (2015), six for By the Way, I Forgive You (2018), three for her work as producer and songwriter on Tanya Tucker's album While I'm Livin' (2019), and ten for In These Silent Days (2021).

She was the most nominated woman at the 61st Annual Grammy Awards, with six, including nominations for Album of the Year (By the Way, I Forgive You), Record of the Year and Song of the Year ("The Joke"). In 2019, Carlile formed an all-female quartet with Amanda Shires, Maren Morris, and Natalie Hemby called the Highwomen. They released their debut album, The Highwomen, in 2019 to critical acclaim and commercial success, and won the Grammy Award for Best Country Song for the track "Crowded Table" in 2021.

Born in Ravensdale, Washington, a rural town southeast of Seattle, Carlile dropped out of high school to pursue a career in music, teaching herself piano and guitar. Her debut major label album, Brandi Carlile (2005), was released to critical acclaim yet achieved limited commercial success. Carlile garnered wider recognition with her 2007 single "The Story", from her album of the same name. In 2017, The Story was awarded Gold status by the RIAA for selling 500,000 copies. That same year, Carlile released Cover Stories, featuring 14 artists covering tracks from the original The Story album, including Adele, Pearl Jam, and Dolly Parton, it debuted at No. 30 on the Billboard 200. All proceeds benefited War Child UK, a charity organization to benefit children whose lives have been directly affected by war. Her fifth album, The Firewatcher's Daughter, earned Carlile her first Grammy nomination, for Best Americana Album in 2016, and peaked at No. 9 on the Billboard 200. Her sixth album, By the Way, I Forgive You, was released in February 2018 to critical and commercial acclaim. It debuted at No. 5 on the Billboard 200, her highest charted position to date, and also reached No. 1 on Billboards Top Rock Albums. Her seventh album, In These Silent Days, was met with further critical and commercial success, debuting at No. 11 on the Billboard 200, and No. 1 on Billboards Top Rock Albums and Folk Albums charts.

Carlile's music through the years has been categorized in several genres, including pop, rock, alternative country, and folk. She said of her style, "I've gone through all sorts of vocal phases, from pop to blues to R&B, but no matter what I do, I just can't get the country and western out of my voice." Carlile has been a part of several activism campaigns and an advocate for causes ranging from spreading awareness for health issues to LGBT rights and empowerment of women.

Life and career

1981–2003: Early life
Carlile was born on June 1, 1981, in Ravensdale, Washington, a small town 30 miles outside Seattle. Growing up in the only house for miles, Carlile played in the woods, built forts, and played music with her brother, Jay, and sister, Tiffany. When she was four, Carlile contracted bacterial meningitis, which almost took her life. Her heart flatlined several times and she was in a coma. Carlile spent her early life living in King County's southern cities of Black Diamond, Maple Valley, and  Auburn, in Sumner, Washington, and briefly lived in West Seattle.

Carlile taught herself to sing when she was a child, and she began singing country songs on stage when she was eight years old. At age eight, Carlile performed Johnny Cash's "Tennessee Flat Top Box" with her mother, Teresa Carlile, and began playing the guitar and writing songs at age 15. At 16, Carlile became a backup singer for an Elvis impersonator. According to Carlile, she was diagnosed with attention-deficit disorder as a teen. She attended Tahoma High School, but later dropped out to pursue her music career. After being introduced to the music of Elton John, Carlile taught herself to play piano, and at 17, she learned to play the guitar.

2004–2006: Career beginnings and debut

Carlile began her career performing in Seattle music clubs with twin brothers Phil and Tim Hanseroth. In the beginning, Columbia Records signed Carlile in 2004 on the strength of songs she had been recording periodically at home. Released in 2005, Carlile showcased those early songs along with newly recorded tracks in the self-titled album Brandi Carlile. The 2006 re-release by Columbia Records included re-recordings of "Throw It All Away" and "What Can I Say".

The album earned enthusiastic reviews; she was featured on Rolling Stones "10 Artists to Watch in 2005" list, and other "artist to watch" lists by Interview and Paste. In his review of the album, Stephen Thomas Erlewine wrote, "The accolades, combined with cover artwork that captures her at her cutest – as if she were a cousin of Rachael Leigh Cook – might make some listeners suspicious of Carlile, since the cumulative effect makes her seem like a pretty, prepackaged creation." He further wrote, "her music is... rich, warm, and seductive, familiar in its form and sound, yet sounding fresh, even original, particularly in how her folky singer/songwriter foundation blends with her art-pop inclinations." The album peaked at No. 80 on the Billboard 200 and reached No. 1 on the US Folk Albums chart.

Shortly after the release of the album, she left her home in Seattle and set out with the Hanseroth brothers, as she had worked with them on her earliest recordings and independent regional tours. The tightly knit trio, which forms the core of her band today, spent the better part of two years on the road honing the songs that would later become part of her album The Story.

By the end of 2006, Carlile had embarked on several headlining tours and supported a variety of artists, including Ray LaMontagne, the Fray, Chris Isaak, Tori Amos, and Shawn Colvin.

2007–2009: Breakthrough with The Story

Her second album, The Story, was produced by T Bone Burnett. It includes a collaboration with the Indigo Girls on "Cannonball". The album was recorded in an 11-day session with Carlile, the Hanseroths, and drummer Matt Chamberlain to capture the raw intensity of Carlile's live performances. The crack in Carlile's vocals during the title track, "The Story", came out by accident and was a direct result of the way the album was recorded. "The Story" was featured heavily in General Motors commercials during the 2008 Summer Olympics, leading to increased exposure to her music. In response to the advertisement, album sales increased 368 percent from 1,323 to 6,198. Sales for the lead single, "The Story", increased in downloads of 28,091 copies."The Story" peaked at No. 5 on the iTunes Music Store's most-purchased list. The song was also used in the 2008 commercial for Super Bock and helped the song reach No. 1 and the album reach No. 4 on the Portuguese charts. "The Story" was featured on the end credits of the romantic drama film The Lucky One. The album has sold more than 257,776 copies in the US and peaked at No. 41 on the Billboard 200 and No. 10 on the US Rock Albums chart.

Music critic Stephen Thomas Erlewine praised Carlile for The Story saying, "The roiling collection fulfills the promise of her remarkable debut, offering resounding confirmation that Carlile is a singular talent."

"It wasn't until 2007's The Story – her T-Bone Burnett-produced sophomore release – that we realized even half of what we'd been dealt. Nearly a minute into the second song, something about her shifted from promise to absolute certainty as Carlile let loose a hurricane of lung power" wrote Rachael Maddux for Paste magazine.

Three songs from her previous album, "Tragedy", "What Can I Say", and "Throw It All Away", were featured in the TV drama Grey's Anatomy. A special two-hour episode of Grey's Anatomy also featured Carlile's song "Turpentine" during footage of the spin-off, Private Practice. Grey's Anatomy also released a version of the music video for "The Story" with interspersed footage of the show. Actor Sara Ramirez performed their version of Carlile's single "The Story" in the musical episode of the show.

In 2007, Carlile performed at the Borderline in London and as guest on Newton Faulkner's UK tour. She was the opening act for Maroon 5 and OneRepublic during their Australia tour. In April 2008, she performed on the BBC2 show Later... with Jools Holland.

Give Up the Ghost was released in 2009 and debuted at No. 26 on the Billboard 200. Produced by Grammy Award-winning producer Rick Rubin, it featured a collaboration with Elton John on the song "Caroline", as well as Amy Ray, drummer Chad Smith, and keyboardist Benmont Tench. In 2010, National Geographic Channel in Latin America chose the song "If There Was No You" from the album as a jingle to promote its series Grandes Migraciones (Great Migrations). Also that same year, during the 21st GLAAD Media Awards, Carlile was nominated for a GLAAD Media Award for "Outstanding Music Artist" for the album. The album peaked at No. 26 on the Billboard 200.

In one of the reviews of the album for Paste, Rachael Maddux wrote, "Writhing and burning and staring at life straight down the barrel, Give Up the Ghost is exactly the album Carlile needed to make at this moment. The production is thick but elegant, applied with full knowledge that the songs could exist beautifully in a sparse acoustic-strummed daze, but that they deserve more than that." She added, "The best part about Give Up the Ghost? She will probably make an even better album one day."

2010–2014: Continued success

In 2011, Carlile's album Live at Benaroya Hall with the Seattle Symphony reached number 14 on the Top Rock Albums chart. The live album finds Carlile performing a mix of original songs and cover material. Recorded during two sold-out shows in November 2010 at Benaroya Hall in Seattle, Washington, the album features Washington-native Carlile and her long-time band (including brothers Phil and Tim Hanseroth) performing alongside the Seattle Symphony. Andrew Leahey from AllMusic called it Carlile's best and wrote, "'Live at Benaroya Hall' is more concerned with dressing up Carlile's music in elegant, orchestral clothing, and the results are pretty stunning, from the grandeur of 'The Story' – now featuring horns, woodwinds, and strings. This isn't Brandi Carlile's first concert album, but it's certainly the best."

In the United States, the album reached peak positions of number 63 on the Billboard 200, number 5 on the US Folk Albums chart and number 14 on the US Rock Albums chart.

Carlile's next album, Bear Creek, released June 5, 2012, was produced by Trina Shoemaker. The album is a collaboration between her and the Hanseroth twins. In an interview with American Songwriter she says, "We decided a decade ago to split everything in our band evenly amongst the three of us. So nobody has any vested interest in getting involved with someone else's song or their story. But nobody has a vested interest in keeping someone out of the story either. It always comes down to what's best for the song." "Heart's Content" from this album was further featured in 2013's romantic movie Safe Haven, when Katie (played by Julianne Hough) and Alex (played by Josh Duhamel) heard it on radio in an empty diner and danced to it.

The album peaked at 10 on the Billboard 200, number 1 on the US Billboard Folk Albums and number 3 on the US Billboard Rock Albums chart.

Carlile was also a judge for the 10th annual Independent Music Awards to support independent artists' careers.

On January 11, 2014, Carlile sang the national anthem for the Saints vs. Seahawks NFL playoff game. She recorded a cover of Fleetwood Mac's "The Chain" for the compilation album Sweetheart 2014.

2015–2016: The Firewatcher's Daughter
Carlile's fifth album The Firewatcher's Daughter released on March 3, 2015, on ATO Records. In a preview of her new album before release, the Boston Globe wrote, "Whether The Firewatcher's Daughter continues the country-folk flirtation of 2012's Bear Creek, returns to the warm adult songcraft of The Story and Give Up the Ghost, or explores some other direction entirely, she's sure to bring emotional intelligence, thoughtful clarity, and, most importantly, the most arresting female voice in pop this side of Adele. I'm betting on her."

"We didn't make any demos. To me rock and roll isn't really a genre but more of recklessness or a risk," Carlile told NPR. "The more something gets ironed out and sure of itself, the less it begins to rock somehow. That is what I think rock and roll is ... and it's scary."

The preview track, "The Eye", for which a video was released prior to the album, is front-porch acoustic. The review from NPR Music said, ""The Eye" is exactly what it proclaims itself to be: a quiet breath in the midst of the album's glorious storm. Rooted in Carlile's love of both classic country and California pop, the song is the kind many other artists are going to want to cover. It will be hard to top the original, though; it so eloquently highlights the telepathic connection Carlile shares with her longtime bandmates. A favorite on recent tours, "The Eye" is destined to become a centerpiece in Carlile's catalog."

The album was No. 1 on Billboards Top Rock Album Chart, and a first for her. This was Carlile's second consecutive album to break the Top-10 after Bear Creek topped out at No. 3. The album topped the charts in both US Folk and US Rock categories.

The Current reviewing the album wrote,

USA Today wrote, "The Firewatcher's Daughter is an album with a big heart, one that responds with love, not fear."

She performed with the Avett Brothers on Late Show with David Letterman on May 4, 2015, singing the song popularized by the Carter Family, "Keep on the Sunny Side". On December 6, 2015, Carlile was nominated for the Top Americana Album category, with her The Firewatcher's Daughter for the 58th Annual Grammy Awards.

Carlile was the featured musical guest on Late Night with Seth Meyers on April 7, 2016. She sang the song "Mainstream Kid" (from The Firewatcher's Daughter), and dedicated the performance to Senator Bernie Sanders, who also appeared on the program that night.

2017–present: Grammy success with By the Way, I Forgive You
Carlile's sixth studio album, produced by Dave Cobb and Shooter Jennings, By the Way, I Forgive You, was released on February 16, 2018, and was preceded by three tracks: "The Joke", "The Mother", and "Sugartooth". Carlile performed songs from the album on Jimmy Kimmel Live!. She also made a guest appearance on John Prine's album The Tree of Forgiveness. By the Way, I Forgive You went on to become the highest-charting album of Carlile's career, reaching No. 5 on the Billboard 200. It also reached the number 1 position on the Billboard Top Rock Albums during the same week. The first single from the album, "The Joke", was listed on Former President Barack Obama's year-end playlist. The album received critical acclaim from critics, leading Carlile to receive 6 nominations at the 61st Annual Grammy Awards, the most nominations for a female in 2019, including the all-genre Album and Song of the Year categories. She won in three categories: Americana album and both best American roots song and best American roots performance (for "The Joke").

In 2019, Carlile co-founded the country music supergroup the Highwomen with Amanda Shires and Maren Morris, later adding Natalie Hemby to complete the line-up. Carlile appeared at Loretta Lynn's 87th birthday concert alongside Tanya Tucker, where the two performed a song from Tucker's upcoming album While I'm Livin', which Carlile produced with Shooter Jennings. The Highwomen also made their live debut during this concert, performing "It Wasn't God Who Made Honky Tonk Angels". Their debut single "Redesigning Women" was released on July 19, 2019, and their self-titled album was released on September 6 to critical acclaim. On January 16, 2019, Carlile appeared as part of a five-hour all-star tribute concert to Chris Cornell, which took place at The Forum in Los Angeles. Carlile performed a rendition of Temple of the Dog's "Hunger Strike", Audioslave's "Like a Stone", and Soundgarden's "Black Hole Sun". All proceeds of the event, hosted by Jimmy Kimmel, went to benefit the Chris and Vicky Cornell Foundation and the Epidermolysis Bullosa Medical Research Foundation. On October 14, 2019, Carlile performed Joni Mitchell's album Blue in its entirety in Los Angeles at Walt Disney Concert Hall.

In February 2020, Carlile was named Record Store Day 2020 Ambassador. On June 2, 2020, Carlile teamed up with remaining Soundgarden members Kim Thayil, Matt Cameron, and Ben Shepherd. At Seattle's London Bridge Studio, they re-recorded new versions of two Soundgarden's songs, "Black Hole Sun" and "Searching with My Good Eye Closed", which was released on a 12-inch single vinyl dubbed "A Rooster Says", during the second of three Record Store Day events on September 26, 2020. In October 2021 Rolling Stone reported that Carlile has expressed interest in continuing her collaboration with the surviving members of Soundgarden.

In April 2021, Carlile released the autobiography Broken Horses: A Memoir. The book debuted at position #1 in non-fiction on the New York Times Best Seller list.

In late September 2021, City of Hope confirmed that Carlile would join the 16th annual Songs of Hope celebration program and would be honored with the She is the Music Award, presented by Universal Music Publishing Group chairman and CEO Jody Gerson, on September 20, 2021.

On October 23, 2021, Carlile was the musical guest on NBC's Saturday Night Live.

In 2022 Joni Mitchell performed with Carlile and her associates as the closing act of the Newport Folk Festival. Mitchell's presence was an unannounced surprise, the performance was billed as "Brandi Carlile and Friends." This was the 78 year old Mitchell's first full-length performance since the early 2000s and her first appearance at the festival since 1969.

Carlile headlined the 2022 Pilgrimage Music & Cultural Festival in Franklin, Tennessee. She thanked the organizers for the opportunity and for placing a woman in this role. The Tennessean called her “Americana’s brightest star” and “(A) beaming presence on Pilgrimage’s main stage.” 

In January 2023, Carlile headlined the inauguration party for Massachusetts Governor Maura Healey, the first lesbian governor in the United States.

Touring and performances
In July 2018, Carlile announced the creation of her own music festival, "Girls Just Wanna Weekend". The festival took place at Puerto Aventuras on the Riviera Maya in Mexico January 30 – February 3, 2019, and was fronted by all-female musicians such as Indigo Girls, Maren Morris, Margo Price, Patty Griffin, and others. Carlile was inspired to create her own festival after participating in the Cayamo Cruise festival for numerous years.

 Personal life 

In a November 2002 interview, Carlile identified herself as a lesbian. She later told the Los Angeles Times, "I don't have to have a lot of formality around it ... there were people before me who paved the way."

In June 2012, she announced she was engaged to Catherine Shepherd, whom she met in 2009. They married in Wareham, Massachusetts, on September 15, 2012. They have two daughters. Since 2012, Shepherd has been the executive director of the Looking Out Foundation, Carlile's nonprofit. She had previously worked as Paul McCartney's charity coordinator for ten years.

Two of Carlile's longtime collaborators are Tim and Phil Hanseroth, with whom she has performed since she was 17 years old. Phil is now Carlile's brother-in-law, having married Carlile's younger sister Tiffany. The three of them have matching tattoos of the Auryn amulet, the double ouroboros that are the central magical item in the book and movie The Neverending Story.

Carlile keeps various animals, including goats, chickens, a horse, a dog, and a cat. She is a Christian and lives in Maple Valley, Washington.

Activism and humanitarian work
In 2008, Carlile and Tim and Phil Hanseroth established the Looking Out Foundation, a 501(c)(3) organization to give financial support to and raise awareness of causes in which they believe. The foundation has awarded grants to multiple organizations including Reverb, Honor the Earth, the Bridge School, Children in Conflict, Black Visions Collective, Campaign Zero, the Women's Funding Alliance, Doctors Without Borders, and the Human Rights Campaign. The Looking Out Foundation has launched numerous grassroots campaigns including Looking Out for the Hungry, Fund Racial Justice, COVID-19 Relief Fund, the IF Project, Fight the Fear, and the Story Campaign. Carlile donates $2 from every concert ticket sale to the foundation. To date, the Looking Out Foundation has donated over $2 million to grassroots causes.

In May 2017, Carlile released Cover Stories, a benefit album featuring songs from her 2007 album, The Story. Troubled by the world's refugee crisis, and the impact it has on children, Carlile and Looking Out Foundation chose War Child UK as the beneficiary of the album. Cover Stories features 14 artists, all of whom cover songs from The Story. Tracks include Dolly Parton's cover of "The Story", Pearl Jam's cover of "Again Today", and Adele's cover of "Hiding My Heart". Other artists featured are the Avett Brothers, the Indigo Girls, Kris Kristofferson, Jim James, Margo Price, Old Crow Medicine Show, the Secret Sisters, Anderson East, Shovels & Rope, Torres, Ruby Amanfu, Miranda Lambert, and Chris Stapleton. Former US President Barack Obama wrote the foreword.

In October 2018, Carlile teamed up with Sam Smith to re-imagine the single "Party of One" as a duet with the proceeds going to the ongoing Story Campaign. Carlile has donated $1 million to War Child UK and Children in Conflict through the Story Campaign and sales of her benefit album Cover Stories.

In October 2020, Brandi teamed up with Alicia Keys to urge people to vote with their song "A Beautiful Noise", which the pair performed on 'Every Vote Counts: A Celebration of Democracy' and aired on CBS on October 29. Carlile commented on this saying, "The evolution of ‘A Beautiful Noise’ represents a group of incredible women from all different walks of life coming together with a universal message of hope and empowerment. It is an important reminder that we all have a voice and that our voices count. It was an absolute dream and honor to join the incomparable Alicia Keys to deliver this beautiful message through song. Alicia lives this song. This is how she walks through the world. I am forever inspired. Please vote".

Influence
Carlile is the inspiration for chef Tom Douglas's 13th Seattle restaurant, The Carlile Room.

DiscographyStudio albums Brandi Carlile (2005)
 The Story (2007)
 Give Up the Ghost (2009)
 Bear Creek (2012)
 The Firewatcher's Daughter (2015)
 By the Way, I Forgive You (2018)
 In These Silent Days (2021)
 In the Canyon Haze (2022)with The Highwomen The Highwomen (2019)Other Cover Stories (2017)as producer'''You Don't Own Me Anymore by The Secret Sisters (2017)While I'm Livin' by Tanya Tucker (2019)Saturn Return by The Secret Sisters (2020)Second Nature'' by Lucius (2022)

Awards

Grammy Awards
The Grammy Awards are awarded annually by The Recording Academy of the United States for outstanding achievements in the music industry. Often considered the highest music honour, the awards were established in 1958. Carlile has received nine awards, from 25 nominations. She is the first female songwriter to receive two Grammy nominations for Song of the Year in the same year, and the first time that any songwriter or songwriting team was nominated for Song of the Year twice in the same year since 1994.

Other awards and nominations
Carlile won Seattle's City of Music Breakthrough Award for 2010.

References

Further reading

External links

1981 births
Living people
American alternative country singers
American street performers
American country singer-songwriters
American women country singers
American women singer-songwriters
American folk singers
American women pop singers
American contraltos
Columbia Records artists
Country musicians from Washington (state)
Women rock singers
Grammy Award winners
American lesbian musicians
LGBT people from Washington (state)
LGBT Protestants
LGBT record producers
American LGBT singers
American LGBT songwriters
Singer-songwriters from Washington (state)
21st-century American women singers
21st-century American singers
People from Auburn, Washington
People from Maple Valley, Washington
People from Sumner, Washington
20th-century American LGBT people
Lesbian singers
Lesbian songwriters
Record producers from Washington (state)
American women record producers
The Highwomen members
ATO Records artists
21st-century American LGBT people
Writers from Seattle
Musicians from Seattle
American lesbian writers